Louise Roy may refer to:
 Louise Roy (politician)
 Louise Roy (administrator) (born 1947)
Louise Roy (Natural Law candidate)